Dennis J. Selkoe (born 25 September 1943) is an American physician (neurologist) known for his research into the molecular basis of Alzheimer's disease. In 1985 he became Co-Director of the Center for Neurological Diseases and from 1990, Vincent and Stella Coates Professor of Neurological Diseases at Harvard Medical School. He is also a Fellow of the  AAAS and a member of the National Academy of Medicine.

Career and early life
Selkoe studied at Columbia University (Bachelor's degree 1965) and the University of Virginia School of Medicine (M. D. 1969). He  took up a residency at the University of Pennsylvania Hospital (1969). From 1970 to 1972, he performed research at the National Institutes of Health and continued his residency as a neurologist at the  Peter Bent Brigham Children's Hospital and Beth Israel Hospital in Boston. 

In 1975, he held the position of instructor at the Brigham and Women's Hospital in Boston, before moving up to  assistant professor  in 1978.

In 1978, he established a laboratory at Brigham and Women's to apply biochemical and cell biological methods to the study of degenerative neural diseases such as Alzheimer's and Parkinson's disease.

In 1982, he and collaborators isolated the clusters of neurofibrils typical of Alzheimer's disease and described their chemical properties. With other laboratories, he showed that the tau protein of the microfibrils is their main component. With his laboratory, he also conducted extensive research on the second pathogenic component, senile plaques of beta-amyloid (Aβ). They discovered in 1992 that Aβ is also formed in normal cells from its precursor amyloid precursor protein. The study of these processes led to the identification of inhibitors for the formation of Aβ. Selkoe was also able to show with his laboratory that innate mutations in the APP genes and the presenilin genes cause Alzheimer's disease (increased Aβ production). In 1999, he and co-workers identified presenilin as a component of the long-sought-after gamma-secretase, one of the enzymes involved in the pathogenic conversion of APP to Aβ in Alzheimer's disease. In his laboratory, it could also be shown that small, soluble oligomers from Aβ can damage the synapses and have an influence on memory performance.

He was the principal founding scientist of the pharmaceutical company Athena Neurosciences (later  Elan Corporation). In 2001 he was one of the founders of the Harvard Medical Center for Neurodegeneration and Repair. He has been on the board of Prothena Corporation since 2013.

He has an h-index of 183 according to Semantic Scholar.

Awards and honors
 Life Achievement Award from the Alzheimer's Association (2008)
 Member of the National Academy of Medicine (2005)
 Fellow of the American Association for the Advancement of Science (2003)
 Dr A. H. Heineken Prize for Medicine (2002)
 Rita Hayworth Award from the Alzheimer's Association (1995)
 Honorary doctorate from Harvard University (1991)
 Potamkin Prize (1989)
 Metlife Foundation Award for Medical Research in Alzheimer's Disease (1986)
 Wood Kalb Foundation Prize (1984)

Publications

Authored
 Immunization Against Alzheimer’s Disease and Other Neurodegenerative Disorders (2003)
 The therapeutics of Alzheimer's disease: Where we stand and where we are heading (2013)
 SnapShot: Pathobiology of Alzheimer's Disease (2013)
 
 Preventing Alzheimer’s Disease' (2012)
 Resolving controversies on the path to Alzheimer's therapeutics (2011)
 Alzheimer's disease (2011)
 Biochemistry and molecular biology of amyloid beta-protein and the mechanism of Alzheimer's disease (2008)
 Soluble oligomers of the amyloid beta-protein impair synaptic plasticity and behavior (2008)
 Developing preventive therapies for chronic diseases: lessons learned from Alzheimer's disease (2007)
  Amyloid beta-peptide is produced by cultured cells during normal metabolism: a reprise (2006)
 The ups and downs of Abeta (2006)

Co-authored

 A Stearoyl–Coenzyme A Desaturase Inhibitor Prevents Multiple Parkinson Disease Phenotypes in α‐Synuclein Mice (with Silke Nuber PhD, Alice Y. Nam BS,  Molly M. Rajsombath BS, Haley Cirka Xiaoping Hronowski PhD, Junmin Wang PhD, Kevin Hodgetts PhD, Liubov S. Kalinichenko PhD, Christian P. Müller PhD, Vera Lambrecht MS, Jürgen Winkler MD, Andreas Weihofen PhD, Thibaut Imberdis PhD, Ulf Dettmer PhD, Saranna Fanning Ph) (2020)
 Analysis of α-synuclein species enriched from cerebral cortex of humans with sporadic dementia with Lewy bodies (with John B Sanderson, Suman De, Haiyang Jiang, Matteo Rovere, Ming Jin, Ludovica Zaccagnini, Aurelia Hays Watson, Laura De Boni, Valentina N Lagomarsino, Tracy L Young-Pearse, Xinyue Liu, Thomas C Pochapsky, Bradley T Hyman, Dennis W Dickson, David Klenerman, Dennis J Selkoe, Tim Bartels) (2020)
 Amyloid β-protein and beyond: the path forward in Alzheimer's disease (with Walsh DM) (2020)
 Dynamics of plasma biomarkers in Down syndrome: the relative levels of Aβ42 decrease with age, whereas NT1 tau and NfL increase (with Mengel D, Liu W, Glynn RJ, Strydom A, Lai F, Rosas HD, Torres A, Patsiogiannis V, Skotko B, Walsh DM. ) (2020)

References 

1943 births
Living people
Columbia University alumni
University of Virginia School of Medicine alumni
Harvard Medical School faculty
American neurologists
Winners of the Heineken Prize
Members of the National Academy of Medicine